Xinfangfangia is a Gram-negative, rod-shaped and non-motile genus of bacteria from the family of Rhodobacteraceae with one known species (Xinfangfangia soli). Xinfangfangia soli has been isolated from soil which was contaminated with diuron near Nanjing in China.

References

Rhodobacteraceae
Bacteria genera
Monotypic bacteria genera
Taxa described in 2018